Eduard Andreev (born March 12, 1980) is a Ukrainian chess grandmaster. He achieved his GM title, by FIDE, in 2005. He is a keen Scotch game player, having only lost 3 out of 20 professional games with it as white.

References

External links
 
 
 News in chess profile

1980 births
Living people
Chess grandmasters
Ukrainian chess players